Melinda Czink was the defending champion, but chose not to participate.

Camila Giorgi won the title, defeating Edina Gallovits-Hall in the final, 6–2, 4–6, 6–4.

Seeds

Main draw

Finals

Top half

Bottom half

References

 Main Draw*

Dothan Pro Tennis Classic - Singles
Hardee's Pro Classic